The standing Committee on Veterans' Affairs in the United States House of Representatives oversees agencies, reviews current legislation, and recommends new bills or amendments concerning U.S. military veterans. Jurisdiction includes retiring and disability pensions, life insurance, education (including the G.I. Bill), vocational training, medical care, and home loan guarantees. The committee oversees the Department of Veterans Affairs (VA), veterans' hospitals, and veterans' cemeteries, except cemeteries under the Secretary of the Interior.

Veterans and other interested people may be surprised to learn that the Veterans' Affairs Committee does not have legislative jurisdiction over the following issues:
 Tax status of veterans benefits and contributions to Veterans Service Organizations (Committee on Ways and Means);
 Military retiree issues, including COLA's and disability pay (Committee on Armed Services);
 CHAMPUS and Tri-Care (Committee on Armed Services);
 Survivor Benefit Program (Committee on Armed Services);
 Veterans Preference in Federal civil service hiring practice (Committee on Government Reform and Oversight);
 Congressional charters for veterans service organizations (Committee on Judiciary);
 Immigration issues relating to veterans (Committee on Judiciary); and
 Issues dealing with Prisoners of War (POWs) and service members missing in action (MIAs) (Committee on Armed Services)
The committee was created by Section 121(a) of the Legislative Reorganization Act of 1946 (Public Law 79-601), which authorized a standing committee of 27 members.

Past and current chairs 

 1947–1948: Edith Nourse Rogers (R-MA)
 1949–1952: John Elliott Rankin (D-MS)
 1953–1954: Edith Nourse Rogers (R-MA)
 1955–1972: Olin E. Teague (D-TX)
 1973–1974: William Jennings Bryan Dorn (D-SC)
 1975–1980: Herbert Ray Roberts (D-TX)
 1981–1994: Gillespie V. Montgomery (D-MS)
 1995–2001: Bob Stump (R-AZ)
 2001–2004: Chris Smith (R-NJ)
 2005–2007: Steve Buyer (R-IN)
 2007–2011: Bob Filner (D-CA)
 2011–2017: Jeff Miller (R-FL)
 2017–2019: Phil Roe (R-TN)
 2019–2023: Mark Takano (D-CA)
 2023–present: Mike Bost (R-IL)

Members, 118th Congress

Resolutions electing members:  (Chair),  (Ranking Member),  (D),  (R)

Subcommittees

Past committee rosters

117th Congress

Resolutions electing members:  (Chair),  (Ranking Member),  (D),  (R),  (D),  (D),  (R),  (D),  (R)

According to committee members' official online biographies, ten (Banks, Bergman, Brown, Ellzey, Gallego, Lamb, Luria, Miller-Meeks, Nehls and Sablan) of the thirty-one members are veterans.

Subcommittees

116th Congress

Sources:  (Chair),  (Ranking Member),  (D),  (R),  (D),   (D)

According to committee members' official online biographies, thirteen (Banks, Bergman, Bost, Cisneros, Dunn, Lamb, Luria, Peterson, Roe, Rose, Sablan, Steube, Watkins) of the twenty-eight members are veterans.

Subcommittees

115th Congress

Sources:  (Chair),  (D),  (R),  (D),  (D)

According to committee members' official online biographies, eleven (Banks, Bergman, Bost, Coffman, Dunn, Higgins, Lamb, Roe, Sablan, Walz, Wenstrup) of the twenty-five members are veterans.

114th Congress

See also
 United States Senate Committee on Veterans' Affairs
 United States Department of Veterans Affairs
 List of current United States House of Representatives committees

References

External links 

 House Committee on Veterans' Affairs (Archive)
 House Veterans' Affairs Committee. Legislation activity and reports, Congress.gov.
 United States Department of Veterans' Affairs
 House Veterans' Affairs Committee Hearings and Meetings Videos
 Active legislation passing through the Committee on Veterans' Affairs can be found here

1947 establishments in Washington, D.C.
Committees of the United States House of Representatives
Military-related organizations
Organizations established in 1947
Veterans' affairs in the United States